Glomeris marginata is a common European species of pill millipede. It is a short millipede, rounded in cross-section, which is capable of rolling itself up into a ball ("volvation") when disturbed. This behaviour is also found in the pill woodlouse Armadillidium, with which G. marginata is often confused.

Distribution
Glomeris marginata is found throughout central and north-western Europe, from Poland and Scandinavia to Spain and Italy. In the British Isles, it is found in all areas south of the Central Belt of Scotland.

Description

Each segment except those at the front and back bears two pairs of legs, with around 18 pairs in total. This distinguishes pill millipedes from pill woodlice, both of which are called "pillbugs" — woodlice have 7 pairs of walking legs, one per body segment, while millipedes have more pairs, and with two pairs to each apparent body segment.

When rolled into a ball, G. marginata can be distinguished from a rolled–up pill woodlouse by the asymmetrical ball it rolls into; pill woodlice roll into much more perfect spheres. The cuticle is also darker and shinier, and the antennae are shorter. The head and tail of a woodlouse have a greater number of small plates, while the head of Glomeris is protected by a single large shield, and it lacks the uropods of woodlice at the read end. Although usually black, red, yellow and brown individuals do occasionally occur.

Ecology

Glomeris marginata lives in leaf litter as well as in grass and under stones, with a preference for calcareous soils. In domestic gardens, they are most frequent along hedgerows and at the bases of old walls, where the mortar has started to crumble, leaching lime into the soil. It is less prone to desiccation than other millipedes and can be found in the open, even in sunny weather, although they are more active at night and prefer more humid areas. G. marginata feeds on old, rotting leaves, despite the higher nutrient content of freshly–fallen leaves, and G. marginata can be responsible for recycling a significant proportion of the nutrients in the leaf litter.

Predators of Glomeris marginata are reported to include the starling, the common toad, the woodlouse spider, and hedgehogs. As well as rolling up into a ball for protection, G. marginata produces noxious chemicals to ward off potential predators, as many millipedes do. One to eight drops of a viscid fluid are secreted, containing the quinazolinone alkaloids glomerin and homoglomerin, dissolved in a watery protein matrix. These chemicals act as antifeedants and toxins to spiders, insects and vertebrates, and the fluid is sticky enough to entrap the legs of ants. Having completely discharged these chemical defences, it can take up to four months for the millipede to replenish their supplies.

Reproduction and life cycle
Breeding takes place cyclically in spring and summer. Male G. marginata are capable of producing a pheromone which attracts females, although this is only believed to be effective over short distances. They then transfer sperm to the female using their gonopods, specially modified legs. After fertilisation, the females lay 70–80 eggs, each about 1 mm long, and each wrapped singly in a capsule of digested earth. The eggs hatch after a period of about two months, with the duration depending on factors including temperature. Development lasts for up to three years, and involves nine moults, following which moults occur periodically as adults. Females are fertile for several years, and can produce six broods over their lifetime, which can be up to eleven years.

References

External links

Glomerida
Millipedes of Europe
Animals described in 1789

fr:Gloméris